Constitutional Amendment 3 of 2004, is an amendment to the Arkansas Constitution that makes it unconstitutional for the state to recognize or perform same-sex marriages or civil unions.  The referendum was approved by 75% of the voters.

Contents
The text of the amendment states:

Results

May 2014 Court Ruling on Amendment 3 and Arkansas Statutes

On May 9, 2014, Sixth Judicial Circuit Judge Chris Piazza ruled the ban on same-sex marriage in the state of Arkansas was unconstitutional, which legalized same-sex marriage in the state.  Previously same-sex marriage was banned by both state statute and the state constitution in Arkansas. Subject to court stays and appeals.

See also
LGBT rights in Arkansas

References

External links
 The Money Behind the 2004 Marriage Amendments  OpenSecrets

U.S. state constitutional amendments banning same-sex unions
2004 in LGBT history
Amendment 3
2004 ballot measures
Arkansas ballot measures
Initiatives in the United States
LGBT rights in Arkansas
Same-sex marriage ballot measures in the United States